Marcelo Martelotte (born 10 December 1968) is a Brazilian professional football coach and former player who played as a goalkeeper. He is the current head coach of Joinville.

Playing career
Known as Marcelo in his playing days, Martelotte was born in Rio de Janeiro. A Taubaté youth graduate, he made his debut for the club in 1987. In 1989, he moved to Bragantino, being a regular starter in Vanderlei Luxemburgo's Série B and Campeonato Paulista winning campaigns.

After a short spell at Santa Cruz, Marcelo returned to Bragantino before joining Santos in 1997. A backup to Zetti at Peixe, he returned to Santa in 1999, and subsequently represented Sport Recife and his first club Taubaté, whom he retired in 2002 at the age of 34.

Managerial career
Martelotte started his managerial career at his last club Taubaté, being manager of the club's youth sides. After a short spell at Palmeiras' under-20s, he was appointed assistant of Pintado in 2005.

In 2010 Martelotte returned to Santos, being named Dorival Júnior's assistant. On 22 September 2010, after the latter's dismissal, he was appointed interim manager; he was also in charge of the club in March of the following year, as a replacement to sacked Adílson Batista.

Martelotte was named Ituano manager on 9 May 2012. He was sacked on 4 September, and was appointed at the helm of Santa Cruz in December 2012.

On 24 May 2013 Martelotte moved to Santa Cruz's fierce rival Sport, after being crowned champions of the year's Campeonato Pernambucano. Sacked on 8 September, he was subsequently in charge of Náutico, Atlético Goianiense (two stints) and América-RN before returning to Santa Cruz on 13 June 2015; with the club in the relegation zone, he ended the year with a top level promotion, finishing second and winning all of the club's last six matches.

Honours

Player
Bragantino
 Campeonato Brasileiro Série B: 1989
 Campeonato Paulista: 1990

 Santa Cruz
 Campeonato Pernambucano: 1993

 Santos
 Torneio Rio-São Paulo: 1997
 Copa Conmebol: 1998

 Sport
 Copa do Nordeste: 2000
 Campeonato Pernambucano: 2000

Manager
 Santa Cruz
 Campeonato Pernambucano: 2013

 Atlético Goianiense
 Campeonato Goiano: 2014

References

External links

1968 births
Living people
Footballers from Rio de Janeiro (city)
Brazilian footballers
Association football goalkeepers
Campeonato Brasileiro Série A players
Campeonato Brasileiro Série B players
Esporte Clube Taubaté players
Clube Atlético Bragantino players
Santa Cruz Futebol Clube players
Santos FC players
Sport Club do Recife players
Brazilian football managers
Campeonato Brasileiro Série A managers
Campeonato Brasileiro Série B managers
Campeonato Brasileiro Série C managers
Santos FC non-playing staff
Santos FC managers
Ituano FC managers
Santa Cruz Futebol Clube managers
Sport Club do Recife managers
Clube Náutico Capibaribe managers
Atlético Clube Goianiense managers
América Futebol Clube (RN) managers
Paraná Clube managers
Esporte Clube Taubaté managers
Manaus Futebol Clube managers
Joinville Esporte Clube managers